Xanthisma texanum, the Texas sleepydaisy or star-of-Texas, is an ornamental plant native to the United States. This plant is usually propagated by seeds.

References

External links
The New York Botanical Garden: Xanthisma texana

Astereae
Flora of Texas
Taxa named by Augustin Pyramus de Candolle